Henry Handley Fletcher (13 June 1873 – December 1923) was an English professional football inside left and outside right who made over 270 appearances in the Football League for Grimsby Town. He also played league football for Notts County and made one appearance for the Football League XI.

Career statistics

References

English footballers
Footballers from Birmingham, West Midlands
Brentford F.C. players
English Football League players
Association football inside forwards
1873 births
1923 deaths
Grimsby Town F.C. players
Notts County F.C. players
Fulham F.C. players
Southern Football League players
English Football League representative players